The North Alabama Birding Trail is a wildlife trail that is not a really a "trail", but a series of sites that have been chosen for their great birdwatching opportunities.

The trail has fifty sites located in 13 counties in North Alabama.

History
The trail was funded by a US$280,000 federal matching grant with US$210,000 provided by the federal government and US$70,000 of matching funds from the chambers of commerce or convention and visitors bureaus of the thirteen counties, the Wheeler National Wildlife Refuge Association, the Tennessee Valley Authority, and several corporate sponsors. The trail was dedicated on September 30, 2005.

Sites 

Information below is presented in more detail in the North Alabama Birding Trail: Visitor Guide (and is the source material for table).

References

See also 
North Alabama Birding Trail - Alabama Birding Trail website

Birdwatching sites in the United States
Protected areas of Alabama